Nehzatabad Rural District is a rural district (dehestan) in the Central District of Rudbar-e Jonubi County, Kerman Province, Iran. At the 2006 census, its population was 19,921, in 3,916 families. The rural district has 49 villages.

References 

Rural Districts of Kerman Province
Rudbar-e Jonubi County